Virani (also Romanized as Vīrānī, Veyrānī, and Wīrāni; also known as Nūrābād) is a village in Shandiz Rural District, Shandiz District, Torqabeh and Shandiz County, Razavi Khorasan Province, Iran. At the 2006 census, its population was 2,784, in 741 families.

References 

Populated places in Torqabeh and Shandiz County